Topsmead State Forest is a Connecticut state forest located in the town of Litchfield. It was formerly the summer residence of Edith Morton Chase, daughter of Henry Sabin Chase, first president of the Chase Brass and Copper Company. She left the house and its grounds to the state of Connecticut on her death in 1972.  The estate house, built in 1929 to a design by RIchard Henry Dana, is a fine example of a Tudor Revival country estate house, and is listed on the National Register of Historic Places.

Setting
It is bounded on the east by Buell Road, the west by Connecticut Route 254, and is crossed in its northern sections by East Litchfield Road and Connecticut Route 118. The main park entrance is on Chase Road, off Buell Road. From the parking area on Chase Road, trails branch out through the forest holdings, a combination of open and wooded areas.

Near the center of the forest, and near the top of the hill, stands the former estate house of Edith Morton Chase.  It is a large two-story structure, with stucco half-timbered walls in the Tudor Revival style.  A central section is flanked by cross-gabled wings, with large westward projection that houses a great living room with a tall ceiling.  The interior is decorated in 1920s style, and retains original fixtures and finishes.  The area around the house is informally landscaped, continued the practice of Edith Morton Chase, for whom it was built.

Recreational uses
The forest is open daily until sunset.  In the warmer months the state sometimes offers tours of the estate house, which is otherwise closed to public access.  The trails on the property support hiking and horse riding.  Hunting is permitted, in season with the appropriate permits, in the forest area north of Route 118.

History
Creation of the forest began in 1916, when Henry Sabin Chase purchased  at the summit of the hill. Chase, owner of one of the most successful metalworking business in Waterbury, Chase Brass and Copper Company died in 1917 and gave the property to his daughter Edith Morton Chase (1890-1972). Chase's daughter Edith took over the property after her father's death, and built a small cottage first and later a tudor-revival style cottage on the summit overlooking an orchard. The present estate house was built in 1924, incorporating elements of the cottage into its form. The house was designed by New York City architect Richard Henry Dana (1879-1933), son of Richard Henry Dana Jr.  Miss Chase occupied the property as a summer residence, and operated much of the surrounding property, which she purchased in stages, as a farm. The bulk of the forest was listed on the National Register of Historic Places in 1993. The house is open for tours seasonally and operated today by the Connecticut Department of Energy and Environmental Protection.

See also
National Register of Historic Places listings in Litchfield County, Connecticut

References

External links
Topsmead State Forest Connecticut Department of Energy and Environmental Protection

Connecticut state forests
Litchfield, Connecticut
Parks in Litchfield County, Connecticut
Protected areas established in 1972
Museums in Litchfield County, Connecticut
Historic house museums in Connecticut
Houses on the National Register of Historic Places in Connecticut
National Register of Historic Places in Litchfield County, Connecticut
Colonial Revival architecture in Connecticut
Tudor Revival architecture in the United States
Houses completed in 1924
Houses in Litchfield County, Connecticut
1972 establishments in Connecticut